Uliji (August 1933 – February 2, 2001) was an ethnic Mongol politician in the People's Republic of China. He was born in Horqin Right Middle Banner, Inner Mongolia. He was Chairman of Inner Mongolia between 1993 and 1998.

References

1933 births
2001 deaths
People's Republic of China politicians from Inner Mongolia
Chinese Communist Party politicians from Inner Mongolia
Chinese people of Mongolian descent
Political office-holders in Inner Mongolia